Free immersion (FIM) is an AIDA International freediving discipline in which the freediver dives under water without the use of propulsion equipment, but only by pulling on the rope during descent and ascent.

Performances may be done head first or feet first during the descent, or a combination of the two.

The current record holders are Petar Klovar (Croatia) with a depth of 132m (433ft), set on 6 Oct 2022 in Kaş, Antalya, Turkey, William Trubridge (New Zealand) with a depth of 124 meters (406 feet), set on 16 June 2016 in Dean's Blue Hole, Bahamas and Sayuri Kinoshita (Japan) with 97 meters (318 feet), set on 26 July 2018 in the Bahamas.

See also

References

External links 
AIDA disciplines definitions
World Record for William Trubridge "Free Immersion" -121 m (396,98 ft)

Competitive apnea disciplines